Vijay Kumar is an Indian politician. He was elected to the Lok Sabha, lower house of the Parliament of India from Gaya in the 2019 Indian general election as member of the ruling Janata Dal (United), part of the National Democratic Alliance. His mother was Bhagwati Devi, a stone-crusher who became an MP in 1996 from Gaya as well.

References

India MPs 2019–present
Lok Sabha members from Bihar
Living people
Janata Dal (United) politicians
People from Gaya, India
1970 births